The white-banded mockingbird (Mimus triurus) is a species of bird in the family Mimidae. It is found in Argentina, Bolivia, Brazil, Chile, Paraguay, and Uruguay.

Taxonomy and systematics

The white-banded mockingbird and the brown-backed mockingbird (Mimus dorsalis) are sister species. Both are monotypic.

Description

The male is slightly larger than the female. Adults have a grayish crown, a white supercilium, a blackish line through the eye, and speckled cheeks. Their upperparts are smoky gray blending to reddish cinnamon on the rump. The central third of the tail is black and the outer feathers white. The folded wing shows a broad white band; the rest of the wing is blackish. The white on the wings and tail are conspicuous in flight. The adults are mostly whitish below; the sides and flanks have a cinnamon wash and the vent area is buffy. The juvenile is similar but with a spotted breast and less white in the wing.

Distribution and habitat

The white-banded mockingbird breeds primarily in central Argentina. In the non-breeding season it apparently withdraws from the southernmost part of its range and is also found in Bolivia, Brazil, Chile, Paraguay, and Uruguay. It is suspected to regularly breed in all of these countries except Brazil and Chile. Vagrants have been recorded in Peru and the Falkland Islands.

The white-banded mockingbird inhabits a variety of landscapes including low woodlands, savanna, open brushy country, steppe, and around human habitations.

Behavior

Feeding

The white-banded mockingbird is thought to be mostly insectivorous in the breeding season but almost nothing is known otherwise.

Breeding

The white-banded mockingbird's nest is an open bowl made of twigs lined with softer material. It is placed low in vegetation, often a thorny bush. It lays its clutch of four eggs (occasionally three) in November and December. Nests are frequently parasitized by the shiny cowbird (Molothrus bonariensis).

Vocalization

The white-banded mockingbird is a "[s]uperlative songster, the most outstanding of genus". Its song is " a long, loud and extended stream of melodic notes and phrases" and it is an excellent mimic.

Status

The IUCN has assessed the white-banded mockingbird as being of Least Concern. It is fairly common to common in most of its range, though the widely scattered breeding records north of Argentina may indicate a more precarious situation there.

Gallery

References

Mimus
Birds of South America
Birds of Bolivia
Birds of Paraguay
Birds of Uruguay
Birds of Argentina
Birds described in 1818
Taxa named by Louis Jean Pierre Vieillot
Taxonomy articles created by Polbot